Christopher Rawlinson may refer to:

 Christopher Rawlinson (antiquary) (1677–1733), English antiquary
 Christopher Rawlinson (judge) (1806–1888), Indian judge
 Chris Rawlinson (born 1972), English track and field athlete